is a town located in Saitama Prefecture, Japan. , the town had an estimated population of 18,594 in 7800 households and a population density of 480 persons per km2.

Geography
Located in central Saitama Prefecture on the lowlands of the upper Arakawa River, Yoshimi is noted for its strawberry production. Parts of the town are within the borders of the Saitama Prefectural Hiki Hills Nature Park.

Surrounding municipalities
Saitama Prefecture
 Kumagaya
 Kōnosu
 Higashimatsuyama
 Kitamoto
 Kawajima

Climate
Yoshimi has a humid subtropical climate (Köppen Cfa) characterized by warm summers and cool winters with light to no snowfall.  The average annual temperature in Yoshimi is 14.2 °C. The average annual rainfall is 1448 mm with September as the wettest month. The temperatures are highest on average in August, at around 26.0 °C, and lowest in January, at around 2.0 °C.

Demographics
Per Japanese census data, the population of Yoshimi peaked around the year 2000 and has declined since.

History
Archaeologists have discovered numerous Kofun period remains from the third through sixth centuries AD within the borders of Yoshimi. The villages of Higashi-Yoshimi, Minami-Yoshimi, Nishi-Yoshimi and Kita-Yoshimi were created within Yokomi District with the establishment of the modern municipalities system on April 1, 1889. Yokomi District was abolished in 1896, becoming part of Hiki District.

On July 1, 1954, the four villages merged to become the village of Yoshimi, which was elevated to town status on November 3, 1972. Attempts to merge Yoshimi with neighboring Higashimatsuyama were rejected by referendum in 2004.

Government
Yoshimi has a mayor-council form of government with a directly elected mayor and a unicameral town council of 14 members. Yoshimi, together with the city of Higashimatsuyama and town of Kawashima, contributes two members to the Saitama Prefectural Assembly. In terms of national politics, the town is part of Saitama 10th district of the lower house of the Diet of Japan.

Education
Yoshimi has six public elementary schools and one public middle school operated by the town government. The town does not have a high school; however, the Musashigaoka College, a junior college, is located in Yoshimi.

Transportation

Railway
 Yoshimi has no passenger rail service.

Highway
 Yoshimi is not located on any national highways.

Local attractions
 The Hundred Caves of Yoshimi, National Historic Site 
 Anraku-ji
 Iwamuro Kannon Hall
 site of Matsuyama Castle
 Kuroiwa Kofun
 Yoshimi Onsen

Notable people from Yoshimi
 Tomoyuki Kubota, professional baseball player
 Momosuke Fukuzawa, Meiji period entrepreneur

References

External links
 
Official Website 

Hiki District, Saitama
Towns in Saitama Prefecture
Yoshimi, Saitama